Galenki (Russian: Галёнки) is a former Russian Air Force base in Primorsky Krai, Russia.  

From January 5, 1942 to October 1945, the 582nd IAP (Fighter Aviation Regiment) was based at the aerodrome, taking part in the Soviet-Japanese war with Lavochkin La-5 aircraft.

Beginning in September 1950, the 18th independent Guards Assault Aviation Regiment.Vitebsk was stationed at Galenki, armed initially with Mikoyan-Gurevich MiG-15 (NATO: Fagot) jets, but upgrading in the 1950s and 1960s to the Mikoyan-Gurevich MiG-17 (NATO: Fresco) and Mikoyan-Gurevich MiG-21 (NATO: Fishbed).  In 1982, the fighter aviation regiment was transformed into an aviation regiment of fighter-bombers.

In May 1989, the regiment re-equipped the MiG-27K and MiG-27D, then in March 1993, the regiment received Sukhoi Su-25 (NATO: Frogfoot) airplanes and was transformed into an assault aircraft unit.

On December 1, 2009, the regiment and airfield support units were transformed into the 6983rd Guards Aviation Base of the first category (military unit 62231). At the end of 2010, the headquarters of the 6983rd was transferred to the Khurba-2 garrison. The air attack aircraft unit was relocated to Chernigovka in Primorsky Krai, where it merged with the remnants of the local 187th Assault Air Regiment.

References

Russian Air Force bases
Soviet Air Force bases